The Cure in Orange is a concert film by British rock group The Cure. It was shot on 35mm film at the Théâtre antique d'Orange in the French countryside (Orange, Vaucluse), on 8, 9, and 10 August 1986. Band members Robert Smith (Vocals & guitar), Simon Gallup (Bass guitar), Porl Thompson (Keyboards, guitar and saxophone), Boris Williams (Drums), and Lol Tolhurst (Keyboards) make their way through 23 songs, under the direction of Tim Pope.

Programme
 "Introduction", Recording of "Relax", from the album Blue Sunshine by The Glove
 "Shake Dog Shake" (The Top)
 "Piggy in the Mirror" (The Top)
 "Play for Today" (Seventeen Seconds)
 "A Strange Day" (Pornography)
 "Primary" (Faith)
 "Kyoto Song" (The Head On The Door)
 "Charlotte Sometimes" (stand-alone single)
 "In Between Days" (The Head On The Door)
 "The Walk" (Japanese Whispers)
 "A Night Like This" (The Head On The Door)
 "Push" (The Head On The Door)
 "One Hundred Years"(Pornography)
 "A Forest" (Seventeen Seconds)
 "Sinking" (The Head On The Door)
 "Close to Me" (The Head On The Door)
 "Let's Go to Bed" (Japanese Whispers)
 "Six Different Ways" (The Head On The Door)
 "Three Imaginary Boys" (Three Imaginary Boys)
 "Boys Don't Cry" (Boys Don't Cry)
 "Faith" (Faith)
 "Give Me It" (The Top)
 "10:15 Saturday Night" (Three Imaginary Boys)
 "Killing an Arab" (Boys Don't Cry)
 "Sweet Talking Guy" (Performed by The Chiffons over credits.)

Critical reception 

Time Out London described it as "An astonishingly lavish production number for one of the world's less dynamic live bands, rendered noteworthy by its setting against the magnificent backdrop of an ancient amphitheatre [...] for Cure fans this is as perfect and cinematographically compelling a record of a gig as could be asked for. For the rest of us, it's a bit of a yawn."
AllMusic Gave This Video 4 Stars Of 5 saying: "the mixing and recording of the show is pristine and would have made an excellent live album...With performance highlights including fantastic versions of "Primary," "A Night Like This," "A Forest," and "Faith," Orange is ample testimony to both the Cure's excellence and Pope's ability to showcase them at their best."

Personnel
Robert Smith – vocals, guitar, 6-string bass
Lol Tolhurst – keyboards
Simon Gallup – bass guitar
Porl Thompson – keyboards, guitar, 6-string bass, saxophone
Boris Williams – drums, percussion

References

External links 

 Prefix magazine article

The Cure video albums
1991 live albums
1991 video albums
Live video albums